Terri Windling (born December 3, 1958 in Fort Dix, New Jersey) is an American editor, artist, essayist, and the author of books for both children and adults. She has won nine World Fantasy Awards, the Mythopoeic Fantasy Award, and the Bram Stoker Award, and her collection The Armless Maiden appeared on the short-list for the James Tiptree, Jr. Award.

In 2010, Windling received the SFWA Solstice Award, which honors "individuals with a significant impact on the speculative fiction field". Her work has been translated into French, German, Spanish, Italian, Czech, Lithuanian, Turkish, Russian, Japanese, and Korean.

Early life 
Terri Windling was born on December 3, 1958 in Fort Dix, New Jersey. She was raised in New Jersey and Pennsylvania. She attended Antioch College, graduating in 1979.

After college, she moved to New York and worked in publishing as an editor and an artist.

Career

Writing 
In the American publishing field, Windling has been one of the primary creative forces behind the mythic fiction resurgence that began in the early 1980s, through her work as an innovative editor for the Ace and Tor Books fantasy lines and as the editor of more than thirty anthologies of magical fiction. She created the Fairy Tale Series of novels that reinterpret classic fairy tales. She is also recognized as one of the founders of urban fantasy, having published and promoted the first novels of Charles de Lint, Emma Bull, and other pioneers of the genre.

With Ellen Datlow, Windling edited 16 volumes of Year's Best Fantasy and Horror (1986–2003), an anthology that reached beyond the boundaries of genre fantasy to incorporate magic realism, surrealism, poetry, and other forms of magical literature. Datlow and Windling also edited the Snow White, Blood Red series of literary fairy tales for adult readers, as well as many anthologies of myth & fairy tale inspired fiction for younger readers, such as The Green Man, The Faery Reel, and The Wolf at the Door. Windling also created and edited the Borderland series for teenage readers, and The Armless Maiden, a fiction collection for adult survivors of child abuse like herself.

As an author, Windling's fiction includes The Wood Wife (winner of the Mythopoeic Award for Novel of the Year) and several children's books: The Raven Queen, The Changeling, A Midsummer Night's Faery Tale, The Winter Child, and The Faeries of Spring Cottage. Her essays on myth, folklore, magical literature and art have been widely published in newsstand magazines, academic journals, art books, and anthologies. She was a contributor to The Oxford Companion to Fairy Tales, edited by Jack Zipes.

In May 2016, Windling gave the fourth annual Tolkien Lecture at Pembroke College, Oxford, speaking on the topic of fantasy literature in the post-Tolkien era.

In 2020, she announced the establishment of a publishing company, Bumblehill Press.

Art 
As an artist, Windling specializes in work inspired by myth, folklore, and fairy tales. Her art has been exhibited across the US, as well as in the UK and France.

Windling is the founder of the Endicott Studio, an organization dedicated to myth-inspired arts, and was the co-editor with Midori Snyder of The Journal of Mythic Arts from 1987 until it ceased publication in 2008. She also sits on the board of the Mythic Imagination Institute.

Personal life 
In September 2008, Windling married Howard Gayton, a British dramatist and co-founder of the Ophaboom Theatre Company, a Commedia dell'arte troupe. Since the early 1990s she has resided in Devon, England; she divided her time between there and Tucson, Arizona for many years.

Windling is a close friend and neighbor of artists Wendy and Brian Froud, and has collaborated with them on several projects.

Works

Fiction
 "The Green Children", The Armless Maiden, Tor Books, 1995
 The Wood Wife, Tor Books, 1996 (winner of the Mythopoeic Award)
 "The Color of Angels", The Horns of Elfland, New American Library, 1997
 The Raven Queen, with Ellen Steiber, Random House, 1999
 The Changeling, Random House, 1995
 The Old Oak Wood Series, Simon & Schuster, illustrated by Wendy Froud
 A Midsummer Night's Faery Tale, 1999
 The Winter Child, 2000 
 The Faeries of Spring Cottage, 2001
 "Red Rock", Century Magazine, 2000 
 The Moon Wife, Tor Books, forthcoming
 Little Owl, Viking, forthcoming

Nonfiction
 "Surviving Childhood", The Armless Maiden, Tor Books, 1995 
 "Transformations", Mirror, Mirror on the Wall: Women Writers Explore Their Favorite Fairy Tales (Expanded Edition), Anchor, 1998
 Co-writer and editor of Brian Froud's Good Faeries/Bad Faeries, Simon & Schuster, 2000
 "On Tolkien and Fairy Stories", Meditations on Middle-Earth, St. Martin's Press, 2001
 Contributing writer to The Oxford Companion to Fairy Tales, edited by Jack Zipes, Oxford University Press, Oxford, 2002
 Contributing writer to Fées, elfes, dragons & autres créatures des royaumes de féerie, edited by Claudine Glot and Michel Le Bris, Hoëbeke, France, 2004 
 Contributing writer to Panorama illustré de la fantasy & du merveilleux, edited by André-François Ruaud, Les Moutons Electriques, France 2004
 Numerous articles on myth and mythic arts for Realms of Fantasy magazine and the Journal of Mythic Arts, 1992–2008

Anthologies
 Elsewhere, Volumes I–III, edited with Mark Alan Arnold, Ace Books, 1981–1983 (winner of the World Fantasy Award for Volume I)
 Faery, Ace Books, 1985 (World Fantasy Award nominee)
 Year's Best Fantasy and Horror series, with Ellen Datlow, 1986–2003 (winner of three World Fantasy Awards and the Bram Stoker Award) 
 Snow White, Blood Red series, with Ellen Datlow
Snow White, Blood Red, Morrow/Avon, 1993 (World Fantasy Award nominee)
Black Thorn, White Rose, Morrow/Avon, 1994; Prime Books, 2007
Ruby Slippers, Golden Tears, Morrow/Avon, 1995; Prime Books 2008
Black Swan, White Raven, Avon Books, 1997; Prime Books, 2008
Silver Birch, Blood Moon, Avon Books, 1999 (winner of the World Fantasy Award)
Black Heart, Ivory Bones, Avon Books, 2000
Sirens and Other Daemon Lovers, with Ellen Datlow, HarperPrism, 1998; Avon, 2002
 The Armless Maiden and Other Tales for Childhood's Survivors, Tor Books, 1995 (James Tiptree, Jr. Award shortlist)
 Retold Fairy Tales series, with Ellen Datlow (for Middle Grade readers)
A Wolf at the Door and Other Retold Fairy Tales, Simon & Schuster, 2000
Swan Sister: Fairy Tales Retold, Simon & Schuster, 2002
Troll's Eye View and Other Villainous Tales, Viking, 2009 
 Mythic Fiction series, with Ellen Datlow, illustrated by Charles Vess (for Young Adult readers)
The Green Man: Tales from the Mythic Forest, Viking, 2002 (winner of the World Fantasy Award)
The Faery Reel: Tales From the Twilight Realm, Viking, 2004 (World Fantasy Award nominee)
The Coyote Road: Trickster Tales, Viking, 2007 (World Fantasy Award nominee)
The Beastly Bride: Tales of the Animal People, Viking, 2010
Salon Fantastique with Ellen Datlow, Thunder's Mouth Press, 2006 (winner of the World Fantasy Award)
Teeth with Ellen Datlow, HarperCollins, 2011
After with Ellen Datlow, Disney/Hyperion, forthcoming 2012
Queen Victoria's Book of Spells with Ellen Datlow, Tor Books, forthcoming 2013

Series edited
 The Fairy Tale Series, created with artist Thomas Canty, Ace Books and Tor Books, 1986 to present – novels that retell and reinterpret traditional fairy tales; by Steven Brust, Pamela Dean, Charles de Lint, Tanith Lee, Patricia C. Wrede, Jane Yolen, and others
 Brian Froud's Faerielands, Bantam Books, 1994 – contemporary fantasy novellas by Charles de Lint and Patricia A. McKillip, illustrated by Brian Froud
 The Borderland Series, New American Library, Tor Books, Harper Prism, 1985 to present
The latter Young Adult shared-world series features the intersection of Elfland and human lands, which is generally populated by teenagers, runaways, and exiles. Primary series writers are Ellen Kushner, Charles de Lint, Midori Snyder, Emma Bull, and Will Shetterly. The series consists of five anthologies and three novels to date.

See also
Bellamy Bach

References

Other sources 

 Terri Windling at the Internet Book List

  by Julie Bartel, The Journal of Mythic Arts, 2005
 Terri Windling interview in Locus Magazine, October 2003
 Zipes, Jack (2000), The Oxford Companion to Fairy Tales, Oxford: Oxford University Press, 
 de Vos, Gail, and Altmann, Anna E. (1999), New Tales for Old: Folktales as Literary Fictions for Young Adults, CT: Libraries Unlimited/The Greenwood Publishing Group, 
 "Into the Woods: The Faery Worlds of Terri Windling", by Donald G. Keller, Legends Magazine, February 1998
 SFWA.org, SFWA Announces 2010 Solstice Award Honorees, SFWA website, May 2010

External links

 

The Journal of Mythic Arts
The Artist as Shaman: Madness, Shapechanging & Art in Terri Windling's The Wood Wife by Niko Sylvester, Mythic Passages Sept–Oct 2003
 "Donkeyskin, Deerskin, Allerleirauh: The Reality of the Fairy Tale" by Helen Pilinovsky (examines the Donkeyskin fairy tale in fiction by Robin McKinley, Jane Yolen, and Terri Windling), Realms of Fantasy magazine, 2001, and The Journal of Mythic Arts, 2005
 Windling interview in ActuSF: French online sf magazine, 2011

The Wood Wife – Q&A with Terri Windling (March 27 – April 3, 2010) 
 

1958 births
Living people
American fantasy writers
American online publication editors
Antioch College alumni
20th-century American novelists
21st-century American novelists
20th-century American women writers
21st-century American women writers
Women science fiction and fantasy writers
World Fantasy Award-winning writers
American women novelists
Women speculative fiction editors